Stephen Vincent White (December 21, 1884 – January 29, 1975) was a Major League Baseball pitcher who played for one season. He played for the Washington Senators and Boston Braves for four combined games during the 1912 season.

External links

1884 births
1975 deaths
Major League Baseball pitchers
Baseball players from Massachusetts
Washington Senators (1901–1960) players
Boston Braves players